Evan Austin (born September 10, 1992) is an American Paralympic swimmer. He represented the United States at the Summer Paralympic Games.

Career
Austin competed in the 400 metre freestyle S7 event at the 2020 Summer Paralympics and won a bronze medal. He also competed in the 50 metre butterfly S7 event and won a gold medal.

References

External links
 
 
 

1992 births
Living people
American disabled sportspeople
American male freestyle swimmers
Paralympic swimmers of the United States
Paralympic gold medalists for the United States
Paralympic bronze medalists for the United States
Paralympic medalists in swimming
Medalists at the 2020 Summer Paralympics
Swimmers at the 2016 Summer Paralympics
Swimmers at the 2020 Summer Paralympics

Sportspeople from Terre Haute, Indiana
American male butterfly swimmers
S7-classified Paralympic swimmers
21st-century American people